Antonela Đinđić, known professionally as Nela, is a Croatian singer and songwriter. She rose to fame by participating in the first season of The Voice – Najljepši glas Hrvatske. Đinđić is most known for her collaboration with Marko Kutlić on the song "U zagrljaju spašeni".

Life and career
In late 2017 Đinđić released her first single titled "Netko kao ti". "Vrijeme je" was released as her second single and became her first song to chart in the Croatian HR Top 40 chart.

Personal life
Đinđić is in a relationship with Croatian singer Marko Kutlić.

Discography

Studio albums

Singles

Awards and nominations

References

External links

Living people
Croatian pop singers
Musicians from Zagreb
21st-century Croatian women singers
Year of birth missing (living people)